CAUCE, or the Coalition Against Unsolicited Commercial Email, is a non-profit advocacy group that works to reduce the amount of unsolicited commercial email, or spam, via legislation. CAUCE was founded in 1997 by participants in the USENET newsgroup news.admin.net-abuse.email and the SPAM-L mailing list.

CAUCE North America was formed in March 2007 from a merger between the very first CAUCE, CAUCE US and CAUCE Canada, combining the strengths of the two sibling CAUCE organizations. CAUCE NA, as an all-volunteer consumer advocacy organization, has moved beyond its original mission of encouraging the creation and adoption of anti-spam laws to a broader stance of defending the interests of the average Internet user. 

Other CAUCE chapters were formed in Canada, Europe (where they were among the first to lobby for effective antispam legislation) and Australia.  CAUCE India was formed in the late 1990s. 

In 2003, APCAUCE (CAUCE Asia Pacific) was formed to bring together CAUCE chapters in the Asia Pacific region, and hosts technical workshops and policy roundtable "regional update" sessions at regional network operator conferences such as SANOG and APRICOT

It is also a member of the Anti-Spyware Coalition.

See also
Neil Schwartzman, a co-founder of CAUCE Canada

References

External links

CAUCE Around the World:
 CAUCE North America
 CAUCE Europe
 APCAUCE
 CAUBE AU

Internet governance advocacy groups
Anti-spam